The prix Erckmann-Chatrian is a literary award from Lorraine, awarded every year since 1925 in memory of the literary duo Erckmann-Chatrian. It rewards a written prose work by someone form Lorraine or about Lorraine. It is often nicknamed the "Goncourt lorrain". The jury consists of literary figures of the four Lorraine departments.

In 1989, a scholarship was added to the prize, a scholarship for historical narrative and monograph. In 1993, this scholarship was divided into "scholarship for history" and "scholarship for monograph".

List of laureates 
 1925: Eugène Mathis, Les Héros : gens de Fraize, L. Fleurent éd.
 1926: Léopold Bouchot, Manuel d'histoire de Lorraine
 1927: Henry Thierry, Anthologie lorraine
 1928: Robert Parisot, Histoire de Lorraine 
 1929: Gabriel Gobron, Contes du Rupt-de-Mad
 1930: Fernand Rousselot, À l'ombre du mirabellier (short stories)
 1931: Jean-Pierre Jean, Mémorial du Souvenir Français en Moselle
 1932: Henri Frémont, Mademoiselle Françoise, journaliste
 1933: Henri Gaudel, Histoires de chez nous (short stories)
 1934: Maurice Garot, Nancy la Ducale
 1935: Marcel Grosdidier de Matons, Au cœur de la Lorraine
 1936: Pol Ramber, Contes vosgiens (short stories)
 1937: Paul-Émile Colin, En Lorraine, par sentiers et venelles (livre d'art, gravures).
 1938: Chanoine Humbert, André Theuriet à Bar-le-Duc
 1939: Martin de Briey, Le Jardin de Vaudémont (novel)
 1940 to 1944 : Not attributed.
 1945: Fernand Fizaine, La Patrie perdue (novel)
 1946: Recteur Jules Blache, Le Grand refus (essay)
 1947: Jacques Dieterlen, Honeck (novel)
 1948: André Monnier-Zwingelstein, Clair-Moutier (novel)
 1949: Gabriel Bichet, Évadés, souvenirs de guerre (narrative)
 1950: René Bour, Histoire illustrée de Metz (monography)
 1951: Chanoine Camille-Paul Joignon, Au cœur du Barrois (monography)
 1952: Léon Fresse, Contes de la vallée des lacs (short stories)
 1953: Pierre Marot, Pour la revue Le Pays Lorrain
 1954: Georges Coanet, Metz pour nous deux (essay)
 1955: André Dorny, Légendes lorraines (short stories)
 1956: Étienne Delcambre, Élisabeth de Ranfaing (essay)
 1957: Jean L'Hôte, La Communale
 1958: Paul Testard, Épinal à travers les siècles (essay)
 1959: René Vigneron, Aubes (novel)
 1960: Yvette Muller, Les Taupins (novel)
 1961: Robert Javelet, Camarade Curé (narrative)
 1962: Jeanne-Berthe Tisserand, Souvenirs d'une réfugiée lorraine (narrative)
 1963: Sylvette Brisson, Emmanuelle s'en va-t-en guerre (novel)
 1964: Louis Baron-Jungmann, Jeux impurs (novel)
 1965: Pierre de la Condamine, Une principauté de contes de fées : Salm en Vosges (essay)
 1966: Georges Bassinot, La Page où l'on meurt (novel)
 1967: Jacques-Joseph Bammert, La Walkyrie (novel)
 1968: Claire Graf, Le Repaire en deuil (novel)
 1969: Gabriel Bastien-Thiry, Les Haies folles (novel)
 1970: Michel Huriet, Une fille de Manchester (novel)
 1971: Henry Najean, Le Diable et les sorcières dans les Vosges (essay)
 1972: Georges Sédir, Les Diplomates (novel)
 1973: Jean Vartier, La Vie quotidienne en Lorraine au XIXe siècle (essay)
 1974: André Jeammaire, Le Vieux Metz (essay)
 1975: Henriette Méline, Catherine (novel)
 1976: Jacqueline Verly, Les Loupiots du Haut- Ravin (novel)
 1977: Roger Bichelberger, Les Noctambules (novel)
 1978: Anne-Marie Blanc, Marie Romaine
 1979: Francis Gruyer, Les Ruines du soleil (novel)
 1980: Caroline Babert, Les Méandres de la Moselle (novel)
 1981: Daniel Kircher, Le Maître des steppes (novel)
 1982: Jules Dauendorffer, J'étais un Malgré-Nous
 1983: Robert Muller, Sima, mon amour (novel)
 1984: Gilles Laporte, Le Moulin du Roué
 1985: Michel Caffier, L'Arbre aux pendus (novel)
 1986: Claude Collignon, L'Enfant pensif (novel)
 1987: François Martaine, Les Pommes noires (novel)
 1988: Madeleine Steil, Le Mas des Micocouliers (novel)
 1989: Anne Perry-Bouquet, Les landaus de la Mère Aza
 1990: Thierry Lentz, Roederer
 1994: Henriette Bernier, Une femme empêchée
 1995: Claude Kévers-Pascalis, Saint Nicolas citoyen romain
 1998: Gaston-Paul Effa, Mâ (Éditions Grasset)
 1999: Philippe Claudel, Meuse l'oubli (Éditions Balland)
 2000: Joël Egloff, Les Ensoleillés (Éditions du Rocher)
 2001: Jocelyne François, Portrait d'un homme au crépuscule (Mercure de France)
 2002: Hubert Mingarelli, La Beauté des loutres  (Éditions du Seuil)
 2003: Pierre Pelot, C'est ainsi que les hommes vivent (Éditions Denoël)
 2004: Gérard Oberlé Retour à Zornhoff (Éditions Grasset)
 2005: Jeanne Cressanges, Le Soleil des pierres (Le Cherche-Midi)
 2006: Georges-Paul Cuny, Anna (Éditions L'Âge d'Homme)
 2007: Michel Bernard, La Tranchée de Calonne (Éditions de la Table ronde)
 2008: Gérald Tenenbaum, L'Ordre des jours (Héloïse d'Ormesson)
 2009: Pierre Hanot, Les Clous du fakir (Fayard Noir)
 2010: Élise Fontenaille, Les Disparues de Vancouver (Grasset)
 2011: Yves Simon, La Compagnie des femmes (Stock)
 2012: Tierno Monénembo,  (Le Seuil)
 2013: Maria Pourchet, Rome en un jour (Éditions Gallimard)
 2014: Nicolas Mathieu, Aux animaux la guerre (Actes Sud)
 2015: Hélène Gestern, Portrait d'après blessure (Arléa)
 2016: Michel Louyot, Un chouan lorrain (Paraiges)
 2017: Edith Masson, Des carpes et des muets (Editions du Sonneur)
 2018: Fabienne Jacob, Un homme aborde une femme (Buchet/Chastel)

References

External links 
 Écrivosges: List of laureates
 Écrivosges : Prix Erckmann-Chatrian
 Site du prix Erckmann-Chatrian

Erckmann-Chatrian
Awards established in 1925
1925 establishments in France